Trinidad, officially the Municipality of Trinidad,  is a 3rd class municipality in the province of Bohol, Philippines. According to the 2020 census, it has a population of 35,119 people.

The municipality was named after Trinidad Roxas, the wife of President Manuel Roxas, and the town is also known for Kawasan Falls and Batungay cave.

The town of Trinidad, Bohol celebrates its feast on May 15, to honor the town patron San Isidro Labrador.

Geography

Barangays
Trinidad comprises 20 barangays:

Climate

Demographics

Economy

Gallery

References

External links

 [ Philippine Standard Geographic Code]
Trinidad

Municipalities of Bohol
Establishments by Philippine executive order